angL is the second full-length solo album of Emperor frontman Ihsahn. Writing began in early 2007, after Ihsahn had completed touring with Emperor. The album was recorded around December 2007 and released on 26 May 2008.

Track listing
"Misanthrope" – 4:58
"Scarab" – 5:17
"Unhealer"  – 6:17
"Emancipation" – 5:27
"Malediction" – 4:19
"Alchemist" – 4:19
"Elevator" – 5:07
"Threnody" – 5:08
"Monolith" – 6:27
"Morningstar"  – 4:49

Personnel
Ihsahn: vocals, guitars, synths / keyboards
Asgeir Mickelson: drums
Lars K. Norberg: Fretless bass

Guest musicians
Mikael Åkerfeldt: vocals on the song "Unhealer"

References 

2008 albums
Ihsahn albums